Miranda Otto (born 16 December 1967) is an Australian actress. She is the daughter of actors Barry and Lindsay Otto and the paternal half-sister of actress Gracie Otto. Otto began her acting career in 1986 at age 18 and appeared in a variety of independent and major studio films in Australia. She made her major film debut in Emma's War (1987), in which she played a teenager who moves to Australia's bush country during World War II.

After a decade of critically acclaimed roles in Australian films, Otto gained Hollywood's attention during the 1990s after appearing in supporting roles in the films The Thin Red Line (1998) and What Lies Beneath (2000). She rose to fame in the early 2000s for her role as Éowyn in Peter Jackson's The Lord of the Rings film series (2001–2003), based on the classic fantasy novel of the same name by English author J. R. R. Tolkien, and will reprise her role in Kenji Kamiyama's 2024 prequel film The War of the Rohirrim.

Early life
Otto was born on 16 December 1967 in Brisbane and was raised there and in Newcastle. She briefly lived in Hong Kong following her parents' divorce at age six. She spent weekends and holidays with her father in Sydney and developed an interest in acting through him.

During her childhood, Otto and her friends wrote scripts and designed costumes and flyers in their spare time. She appeared in several plays at the Nimrod Theatre, which attracted the attention of casting director Faith Martin. Subsequently, Otto received a role in the 1986 World War II drama Emma's War.

She had wanted to be a ballerina but was forced to abandon this goal due to moderate scoliosis. Otto graduated from the National Institute of Dramatic Art in Sydney in 1990. Prior to graduation, she appeared in minor film roles including Initiation (1987) and The 13th Floor (1988).

Career

Early career
Otto's first post-graduation film role in 1991, as Nell Tiscowitz in The Girl Who Came Late, was her breakthrough role which brought her to the attention of the Australian film industry and the general public. In the film, directed by Kathy Mueller, she starred as a young woman who could communicate with horses. Her appearance garnered Otto her first Australian Film Institute nomination for the best actress award the following year.

Otto's next role was in The Last Days of Chez Nous (1991), which portrayed the complex relationships between the members of an Australian family. The film earned Otto her second Australian Film Institute nomination, this time for the best supporting actress award.

In 1993, Otto co-starred with Noah Taylor in the sexually provocative comedy film The Nostradamus Kid, which was based on the memories of author Bob Ellis during the 1960s. Otto was drawn to the film because she was "fascinated by the period and the people who came out of it". A small role in the independent film Sex Is a Four Letter Word followed in 1995.

In 1995, she began to doubt her career choice as she failed to get the parts for which she auditioned. She retreated to her home in Newcastle for almost a year, during which she painted her mother's house. In 1996, director Shirley Barrett cast Otto as a shy waitress in the film Love Serenade. She played Dimity Hurley, a lonely young woman who competes with her older sister Vicki-Ann for the attention of a famous DJ from Brisbane. She starred in the 1997 films The Well and Doing Time for Patsy Cline. When Otto received the film script for The Well, she refused to read it, fearing that she would not get the part. Otto believed that she could not convincingly play the role of Katherine, who is supposed to be 18, as she was 30 at the time. The film, directed by Samantha Lang, starred Otto as a teenager involved in a claustrophobic relationship with a lonely older woman. The Well received mixed reviews; critic Paul Fisher wrote that Otto's performance was not "convincing" as she was "playing another repetitious character about whom little is revealed", while Louise Keller stated that Otto had delivered "her best screen performance yet." Otto earned her third Australian Film Institute nomination for the film. Later that year, she co-starred with Richard Roxburgh in the drama Doing Time for Patsy Cline. The low-budget Australian film required Otto to perform country music standards and also received mixed reviews from film critics.

Soon after the release of The Well and Doing Time for Patsy Cline, magazines and other media outlets were eager to profile the actress. In 1997, Otto began dating her Doing Time for Patsy Cline co-star Richard Roxburgh. Her involvement with Roxburgh made her a regular subject of Australian tabloid magazines and media at the time, a role to which she was unaccustomed.

Otto's next project was the romantic comedy Dead Letter Office (1998). The film was Otto's first with her father, Barry, who makes a brief appearance. In the Winter Dark, directed by James Bogle, followed later that year. Otto played Ronnie, a pregnant woman recently abandoned by her boyfriend. The film was a critical success in Australia, and Otto was nominated for her fourth Australian Film Institute Award. A small role in The Thin Red Line (1998) led to further film roles outside of Australia, such as in Italy, where she co-starred as Ruth in the low-budget Italian film La volpe a tre zampe ("The Three-legged Fox"), produced in 2001 and broadcast for the first time on Italian television in March 2009.

Hollywood

Otto's first Hollywood role was the suspense thriller What Lies Beneath in 2000. She played Mary Feur, a mysterious next-door neighbor.

In 2001, she was cast as a naturalist in the comedy Human Nature. Writer Charlie Kaufman, impressed by her audition two years earlier for his film Being John Malkovich, arranged for Otto to audition and meet with the film's director Michel Gondry. Critic Jeffrey M. Anderson criticized Otto's French accent and wrote that she "doesn't seem to mesh with what's going on around her".

Also in 2001, Otto appeared in the BBC adaptation of Anthony Trollope's The Way We Live Now, as a strong-willed American Southerner.

In 1999, Otto was cast as Éowyn in The Lord of the Rings film trilogy, after Uma Thurman turned down the role. Director Peter Jackson cast her immediately after viewing the audition video she had filmed in Australia. For the role, Otto spent six weeks learning stunt choreography and horse riding. Otto's character was introduced in the trilogy's second film The Lord of the Rings: The Two Towers in 2002 and appeared in the third film, The Lord of the Rings: The Return of the King, the following year. The Lord of the Rings trilogy was a critical and financial success, and the third film won the Academy Award for Best Picture in 2004. Otto's performance earned her an Academy of Science Fiction, Fantasy & Horror Films nomination for Best Supporting Actress.

Otto's next project was playing the lead in the Australian film Danny Deckchair (2003). She then took on the Australian television miniseries Through My Eyes: The Lindy Chamberlain Story (2004). The film is a drama that portrays the story of Lindy Chamberlain, who was wrongfully convicted in 1982 of killing her baby daughter, Azaria, in one of the country's most publicized murder trials. Otto was cast as Chamberlain, and her husband, Peter O'Brien, was cast as prosecutor Ian Barker. She was drawn to the role because it provided her with the "prospect of exploring an unconventional character." At the 2005 Logie Awards, Otto won Most Outstanding Actress in a Drama Series for her role.

Director Steven Spielberg, impressed by Otto's performance in The Lord of the Rings, called her to ask if she would play opposite Tom Cruise in the big-budget science fiction film War of the Worlds (2005). Otto, pregnant at the time, believed she would have to turn down the role, but the script was reworked to accommodate her. After giving birth to her daughter, she took a rest from films to concentrate on motherhood and theatre roles in Australia.

In 2007, Otto starred as Cricket Stewart, the wife of a successful director, in the television miniseries The Starter Wife. That same year, she was cast in the American television series Cashmere Mafia. In the series she plays Juliet Draper, a successful female executive who must rely on her friends to juggle the demands of a career and family in New York City. Otto chose to star in the series because "American television at the moment is so interesting and, particularly, the characters for women are so fantastic" and she "liked the idea of having a character over a long period of time and developing it." The series was cancelled in May 2008.

Otto starred opposite Stephanie Sigman and Anthony LaPaglia in the horror prequel Annabelle: Creation, directed by David F. Sandberg. The film was released on 12 August 2017. She portrayed Zelda Spellman in Netflix's Chilling Adventures of Sabrina (2018-2020).

On 31 May 2020, Otto joined Josh Gad's YouTube series Reunited Apart, which reunites the cast of popular films through video-conferencing and promotes donations to non-profit charities, with her fellow Lord of the Rings cast and crew members.

On 15 June 2022, Otto was announced to be reprising her role as Éowyn from Peter Jackson's The Lord of the Rings film series in the anime fantasy film The Lord of the Rings: The War of the Rohirrim (2024), a prequel directed by Kenji Kamiyama, to which she would serve as the narrator.

Theatre 
Otto made her theatrical debut in the 1986 production of The Bitter Tears of Petra Von Kant for the Sydney Theatre Company. Three more theatrical productions for the Sydney Theatre Company followed in the late 1980s and early 1990s. In 2002, she returned to the stage playing Nora Helmer in A Doll's House opposite her future husband Peter O'Brien. Otto's performance earned her a 2003 Helpmann Award nomination and the MO Award for "Best Female Actor in a Play".

Her next stage role was in the psychological thriller Boy Gets Girl (2005), in which she played Theresa, a journalist for a New York magazine. Otto committed to the project days before she found out she was pregnant. Robyn Nevin, the director, rescheduled the production from December 2004 to September 2005 so Otto could appear in it. In 2005, Nevin began pre-production on a play commissioned especially for Otto.

Personal life
On 1 January 2003, she married actor Peter O'Brien, after the two met while performing in A Doll's House. Otto and O'Brien have one child, a daughter. The pregnancy almost forced her to turn down her role in War of the Worlds. After the birth of her daughter, Otto limited her work to spend more time with her family at their home in Australia.

Filmography

Film

Television

Awards and nominations

References

External links 

 

1967 births
20th-century Australian actresses
21st-century Australian actresses
Actresses from Brisbane
Actresses from New South Wales
Australian film actresses
Australian stage actresses
Australian television actresses
Living people
Logie Award winners
National Institute of Dramatic Art alumni
Outstanding Performance by a Cast in a Motion Picture Screen Actors Guild Award winners
People from Newcastle, New South Wales
Best Supporting Actress AACTA Award winners